REBELS (レベルス) is a defunct martial arts entertainment planning and promotion brand, which was established in 2010 and merged into KNOCK OUT in 2021.

History
REBELS was established by the former two-weight Marital Arts Japan kickboxing champion Genki Yamaguchi on December 1, 2009, with the aim of popularizing the sport of muay thai in Japan. The inaugural event was held jointly by M-1 Challenge and Cross-Point on January 29, 2010, and was headline by a lightweight bout between Arashi Fujihara and TOMONORI. Starting with the third event, REBELS-EX, Cross Point broke their partnership with M-1 and remained as the sole promoter and organizer of the events.

On June 11, 2011, REBELS announced a partnership with the Dutch-based It's Showtime, which allowed cross-promotion and mutual exchange of fighters under contract. The first joint event was held on July 18, 2011, under the name “Stand up JAPAN!” REBELS × IT'S SHOWTIME 〜 REBELS.8 〜 and was headlined by a -61 kg title eliminator between REBELS contracted Kan Itabashi and Genki Yamamoto.

On October 28, 2012, REBELS announced events from that point forward would be held under two rulesets: REBELS rules, which was similar to K-1 and REBELS Muay Thai rules, which allowed for elbows, sweeps and five-round bouts.

REBELS entered into a partnership with KNOCK OUT on May 20, 2019, which likewise held events under kickboxing and muay thai rules. On June 15, 2020, Bushido Road sold Knock Out ownership rights to Def Fellow, the operating company of Rebels. The final REBELS event, "REBELS～The FINAL～", was held on February 28, 2021. A month later, the brand was merged with KNOCK OUT.

Rules
REBELS Rules: Strikes with the fist, knee and leg were allowed; elbow strikes, clinching and sweeps were prohibited. Matches were contested in three, three-minute rounds.
REBELS Muay Thai: Strikes with the fist, knee, leg and elbows were allowed; clinching was allowed so long as one of the fighters remains active. Matches were contested in five, three-minute rounds.
Fouls: Spitting, biting, strikes to the groin, strikes to the back of the head, strikes after the referee has called for a break and strikes thrown at an opponent in a state of knockdown were considered fouls under both rules-sets. Additionally, elbows strikes and prolonged clinching were considered founds under the REBELS Rules.
Scoring: Number of knockdowns and presence or absence of damage was the primary scoring criteria, with three knockdowns in a single round resulting in an automatic technical knockout. Number of clean strikes and ring generalship was the secondary scoring criteria.

Championships history

REBELS Super Welterweight Championship
Weight limit: 
REBELS Rules

REBELS Muay Thai Rules

REBELS Welterweight Championship
Weight limit: 
REBELS Rules

REBELS Muay Thai Rules

REBELS Super Lightweight Championship
Weight limit: 
REBELS Rules

REBELS Muay Thai Rules

REBELS Lightweight Championship
Weight limit: 
REBELS Rules

REBELS Muay Thai Rules

REBELS Super Featherweight Championship
Weight limit: 
REBELS Rules

REBELS Muay Thai Rules

REBELS Featherweight Championship
Weight limit: 
REBELS Rules

REBELS Muay Thai Rules

REBELS Super Bantamweight Championship
Weight limit: 

REBELS Muay Thai Rules

REBELS Super Flyweight Championship
Weight limit: 
REBELS Rules

REBELS Muay Thai Rules

REBELS Flyweight Championship
Weight limit: 
REBELS Muay Thai Rules

REBELS Women's Atomweight Championship
Weight limit: 
REBELS Muay Thai Rules

References

Kickboxing organizations
Sports organizations established in 2008
2010 establishments in Japan
Kickboxing in Japan